Miroslav Šmajda (also known as Miro Šmajda and Max J Mai, born 27 November 1988 in Košice, Czechoslovakia) is a Slovak singer living in Prague. He represented Slovakia in the Eurovision Song Contest 2012 with the song "Don't Close Your Eyes".

Life and career 
Šmajda grew up in eastern Slovakia with his mom, his father is Czech. Šmajda finished in second place in the Czech and Slovak casting show SuperStar in 2009. In November 2010, he released his first solo album Čo sa týka lásky (Regarding Love) and in 2013 his second album mirosmajda.com. In 2015 he released a debut album Terrapie with his band Terrapie and in 2018 album Je Tu Léto with Czech legendary rock/country band . 

In November 2011, Slovak broadcaster RTVS announced that he was picked to represent his home country in the Eurovision Song Contest 2012. In Baku he sang his song "Don’t Close Your Eyes" under his stage name Max Jason Mai, and finished in 18th (last) place in his semi-final, thus failing to make the grand final.

Discography

Albums
Solo albums
 Čo sa týka lásky (2010)
 mirosmajda.com (2013)

Albums with bands
 Terrapie (2015)
 Walda Gang - Je tu Léto (2018)
 Terrapie - TBA (2021)

Singles
Solo singles

 "Last Forever"
 "Baby"
 "Pod vodou"
 "Loneliness"
 "Nostalgie"
 "Každý Deň"
 "Miluj"
 "Don't Close Your Eyes" (as MAXJMAI)

Terrapie singles

 "Narkoman"
 "Do Pekla Jo"
 "Sněhurva"
 "Tam Život Je Fajn"
 "Pán Prctenů"
 "Až Roztaje Sníh"

References

External links 

1988 births
Living people
Eurovision Song Contest entrants for Slovakia
Eurovision Song Contest entrants of 2012
Slovak people of Czech descent